Łužyca (Lower Sorbian for "Lusatia") is a television magazine of the Rundfunk Berlin-Brandenburg (RBB), which is primarily aimed at the Sorbs/Wends in Lower Lusatia in Brandenburg. The contributions are broadcast in Lower Sorbian and have German subtitles.

Łužyca was first broadcast and produced by the former Ostdeutscher Rundfunk Brandenburg (ORB) in 1992. Today the magazine is published every four weeks. The programme deals with the political and cultural concerns of the Lower Sorbs. A monothematic programme is broadcast every three months.

Anja Pohontsch and Christian Matthée will alternate in the moderation.

External links
 

1992 German television series debuts
2000s German television series
2010s German television series
Lower Sorbian-language television shows
1992 establishments in Germany
Mass media in Cottbus
Rundfunk Berlin-Brandenburg
Ostdeutscher Rundfunk Brandenburg